Richard Allen Gregory (born April 15, 1929) is a Canadian football player.

A graduate of Billings High School and the University of Minnesota and drafted by the Chicago Bears in 1952, Gregory came to Canada to play professionally. He started with the Saskatchewan Roughriders in 1952, but it was the next year when he had a career season. Playing with the Toronto Balmy Beach Beachers he scored 98 points in 10 games (best in both the ORFU or CFL), helped win the league championship, was an all-star, and won the Imperial Oil Trophy as league MVP. After a try out with the Green Bay Packers, he returned to the ORFU in 1957, playing a season with the Sarnia Imperials.

References

1929 births
Minnesota Golden Gophers football players
Saskatchewan Roughriders players
Sarnia Imperials players
Ontario Rugby Football Union players
Living people
Toronto Balmy Beach Beachers players